State Road 537 was a short  Florida State Road in Orange County, located entirely in Winter Garden and locally named Dillard Street. It was a commuter route of SR 535; the other commuter routes in Winter Garden are Colonial Drive and SR 438.  The southern terminus was SR 50, and the northern terminus was SR 438.  South of SR 50, it became Daniels Road. Beyond its northern terminus, it became a residential street that extends to the shore of Lake Apopka.

This road was decommissioned by the state in late 2009; all signage indicating the road number has been removed.

Major intersections

References

537
537
Winter Garden, Florida